U.S. Lady was a free magazine aimed at the military wives of men in the U.S. military. It was launched in 1955 by George Lincoln Rockwell in Washington DC as a money-making venture after his discharge from the U.S. Navy Reserve. U.S. Lady vigorously promoted the role of military wives as the unofficial ambassadors in host nations. Due to conflicts with his business partners and financial backers, Rockwell sold the magazine the following year, having published only four issues. U.S. Lady magazine was purchased in 1956 by Avandee and John Adams, two civilian journalists.

In 1958, Rockwell founded the American Nazi Party. Subsequent to that, Avandee and John Adams said they knew nothing of the original publisher's extremist views, and they assured readers that Rockwell was not involved with the magazine in any way after its sale. Rockwell's political views had never been espoused in the magazine during his tenure with U.S. Lady.

References

1955 establishments in Washington, D.C.
Defunct women's magazines published in the United States
Free magazines
Magazines established in 1955
Magazines with year of disestablishment missing
Magazines published in Washington, D.C.